Carry On Cowboy is a 1965 British comedy Western film, the eleventh in the series of 31 Carry On films (1958–1992). It was the first film to feature series regulars Peter Butterworth and Bernard Bresslaw. Series regulars Sid James, Kenneth Williams, Jim Dale, Charles Hawtrey and Joan Sims all feature, and Angela Douglas makes the first of her four appearances in the series. Kenneth Williams, usually highly critical of all the Carry on films he appeared in, called the film "a success on every level" in his diary, taking pride in its humour and pathos.

Plot
Outlaw Johnny Finger, better known as The Rumpo Kid (Sid James), rides into the frontier town of Stodge City, and immediately guns down three complete strangers, orders alcohol at the saloon—horrifying Judge Burke (Kenneth Williams), the teetotal Mayor of Stodge City—and kills the town's sheriff, Albert Earp (Jon Pertwee). Rumpo then takes over the saloon, courting its former owner, the sharp-shooting Belle (Joan Sims), and turns the town into a base for thieves and cattle-rustlers.

In Washington DC, English "sanitation engineer first class" Marshal P. Knutt (Jim Dale) arrives in America in the hope of revolutionising the American sewerage system. He accidentally walks into the office of the Commissioner, thinking it to be the Public Works Department, and is mistaken for a US Peace Marshal, and is promptly sent out to Stodge City.

The Rumpo Kid hears of the new Marshal, and tries all he can to kill the Marshal without being caught, including sending out a pack of Indians, led by their Chief Big Heap (Charles Hawtrey) and hanging the Marshal after framing him for cattle rustling. Knutt is saved by the prowess of Annie Oakley (Angela Douglas), who has arrived in Stodge to avenge Earp's death and has taken a liking to Knutt.

Eventually, Knutt runs Rumpo out of town, but once Rumpo discovers that Knutt really is a sanitary engineer and not the Peace Marshal he once thought, he swears revenge, returning to Stodge City for a showdown at high noon. Knutt conceals himself from Rumpo's gang in drainage tunnels beneath the main street, emerging momentarily from manholes to pick them off one by one. He does not capture Rumpo, who escapes town with the aid of Belle.

Cast

Crew
Screenplay – Talbot Rothwell
Music – Eric Rogers
Songs – Eric Rogers & Alan Rogers
Associate Producer – Frank Bevis
Art Director – Bert Davey
Editor – Rod Keys
Director of Photography – Alan Hume
Camera Operator – Godfrey Godar
Assistant Director – Peter Bolton
Unit Manager – Ron Jackson
Make-up – Geoffrey Rodway
Sound Editor – Jim Groom
Sound Recordists – Robert T MacPhee & Ken Barker
Hairdressing – Stella Rivers
Costume Designer – Cynthia Tingey
Assistant Editor – Jack Gardner
Horse Master – Jeremy Taylor
Continuity – Gladys Goldsmith
Producer – Peter Rogers
Director – Gerald Thomas

Production 
The film was made between 12 July and 3 September 1965. Interiors were done at Pinewood Studios, Buckinghamshire while exteriors were shot on Chobham Common, Surrey
and at Black Park, Fulmer, Buckinghamshire.

Soundtrack
Carry on Cowboy was the first film in the series to have a sung main titles theme. Douglas has a saloon bar scene in which she sings "This is the Night for Love".

Critical reception
Writing in 1966, The Monthly Film Bulletin opined "there are some quite clever and amusing ideas, but an even heavier than usual reliance on outrageous puns and not particularly subtle double entendres. This, in fact, is the nearest-the-knuckle of the series, and some of the gags make the "A" certificate eminently reasonable". More recently, Allmovie called the film "one of the best of the long-running Carry On series."

Notes
Citations

Bibliography

Keeping the British End Up: Four Decades of Saucy Cinema by Simon Sheridan (third edition) (2007) (Reynolds & Hearn Books)

External links
 
 
 
Carry on Cowboy at the British Film Institute's Screenonline

1965 films
1960s historical comedy films
1960s Western (genre) comedy films
British historical comedy films
British Western (genre) comedy films
Carry On films
1960s English-language films
Films directed by Gerald Thomas
Films shot at Pinewood Studios
Films produced by Peter Rogers
Films with screenplays by Talbot Rothwell
1965 comedy films
1960s British films
Foreign films set in the United States